The Gulf of Martaban or the Gulf of Mottama is an arm of the Andaman Sea in the southern part of Burma. The gulf is named after the port city of Mottama (formerly known as Martaban). The Sittaung, Salween and Yangon rivers empty into it.

A characteristic feature of the Gulf of Martaban is that it has a tide-dominated coastline. Tides ranges between 4–7 m  with the highest tidal range at the Elephant Point in the western Gulf of Martaban.

During spring tide, when the tidal range is around 6.6 m, the turbid zone covers an area of more than 45,000 km2 making it one of the largest perennially turbid zones of the world's oceans. During neap tide, with tidal range of 2.98 m, the highly turbid zone coverage drops to 15,000 km2. The edge of the highly turbid zone migrates back-and-forth in-sync with every tidal cycle by nearly 150 km.

The gulf is home to varieties of species  and the Eden's whale was scientifically recognized in the water.

In 2008, the region was found to be rich with oil deposits. It has been a site of oil exploration since 2014 under the "Zawtika development project", an international consortium of American, British, French, Chinese, Thai, Indonesian (PT Gunanusa) and Indian oil and construction companies exploring oil in M7, M9 and M11 blocks.

References

Bodies of water of Myanmar
Martaban
Andaman Sea
Bay of Bengal
Ramsar sites in Myanmar
Important Bird Areas of Myanmar